Le Futur immédiat is a Belgian novel by Dominique Rolin. It was first published in 2001.

References 

2001 Belgian novels
French-language novels